Rio Verde Esporte Clube, commonly known as Rio Verde, is a Brazilian football team based in Rio Verde de Mato Grosso, Mato Grosso do Sul state.

History
The club was founded on December 17, 1991. Rio Verde won the Campeonato Sul-Mato-Grossense Second Level in 2004.

Achievements

 Campeonato Sul-Mato-Grossense Second Level:
 Winners (1): 2004

Stadium
Rio Verde Esporte Clube play their home games at Estádio Cezário Balbino de Freitas. The stadium has a maximum capacity of 3,000 people.

References

Association football clubs established in 1991
Football clubs in Mato Grosso do Sul
1991 establishments in Brazil